Dave & Buster's is an American restaurant and entertainment business headquartered in Dallas. Each Dave & Buster's has a full-service restaurant, full bar, and a video arcade. As of October 2022, the company has 151 locations in the United States, two in Puerto Rico and two in Canada.

History

The first Dave & Buster's was opened in Dallas in 1982 by David Corriveau and James "Buster" Corley. Corley had previously operated a bar called "Buster's" in Little Rock, Arkansas, next door to a saloon and game parlor called "Cash McCool's", owned by Corriveau. After opening Dave & Buster's, the two operated as co-CEOs.

In 1989, Edison Brothers Stores purchased a majority ownership in the restaurant to finance further expansion into other cities. Dave & Buster's was spun off from Edison Brothers, and went public with Andy Newman as chairman in 1995. By 1997 the chain had ten locations across the country.

D&B acquired nine Jillian's locations after Jillian's filed for Chapter 11 Bankruptcy in 2004. Seven of these Jillian's locations were rebranded with the Dave & Buster's name, while two were closed following the acquisition. The company announced on December 8, 2005, that it would be acquired by private equity firm Wellspring Capital Management.
On July 16, 2008, Dave & Buster's Holdings Inc, filed with the SEC to again become a publicly traded company. The company had set a date for the Initial public offering IPO of October 5, 2012. However, it pulled out right before it opened. In June 2010, Oak Hill Capital Partners, in partnership with the company's management team, completed its acquisition of Dave & Buster's from Wellspring Capital Management.

In October 2014, Dave & Buster's launched a second IPO, selling 5.88 million shares at an offering price range of $16–18. The offering raised $94 million, to be used for debt repayments. Shares are traded on the NASDAQ stock exchange using the symbol PLAY.

Dave & Buster's, as with all other entertainment and restaurant businesses, was affected by the COVID-19 pandemic due to restrictions on non-essential businesses. The company's same-store sales fell by 70% during fiscal year 2020. As restrictions eased, the company began to recover in fiscal year 2021, being down only 10%, although Omicron variant resulted in a decrease in the fourth quarter of 2021.

Dave & Buster's CEO Brian Jenkins retired in September 2021, with chairman Kevin Sheehan named interim CEO. On April 6, 2022, Dave & Buster's announced that it would acquire the Plano, Texas-based family entertainment center chain Main Event Entertainment from Ardent Leisure and RedBird Capital Partners for $835 million, with its CEO Chris Morris becoming the new CEO of Dave & Buster's upon the completion of the sale in June 2022. Main Event will operate alongside the main Dave & Buster's chain, differentiated by their formats (with Main Event locations typically being larger than the average Dave & Buster's location, and including activities such as bowling and laser tag) and market positioning (with Main Event having typically targeted families, and Dave & Buster's having typically targeted young adults). Dave & Buster's has not ruled out the possibility of converting some of its larger locations to the Main Event format, and opening smaller Dave & Busters locations in the same market to supplant them.

Operations

Food and drinks
Items on the Dave & Buster's menu are offered from early lunch until late night and include pastas, burgers, steaks, seafood, chicken and desserts. The menu is frequently updated to reflect current trends and guest favorites. Some locations serve Sunday brunch. Buffets are available for special events and private parties. All D&Bs offer full bar service. Dave & Buster's is more targeted towards an adult clientele than most location-based entertainment in general, with all guests under 21 required to be accompanied by a guardian and only allowed in until 10 p.m.

Games
Dave & Buster's dubbed their arcade section, which features interactive games and simulators, "Million Dollar Midway". In 1997, Dave & Buster's introduced the Power Card, a declining balance card or 'debit card' that replaces traditional tokens and tickets, and is required to activate most arcade games and can be reloaded at so called "power stations". The Power Card is intended to enable customers to activate games more easily and encourage extended play of games to increase customer spending. By replacing most coin operations, the Power Card has reduced the technical difficulties and maintenance issues associated with coin-operated equipment.  In 2015, Dave & Buster's installed proximity game card readers that allow guests to simply tap on the readers to play. Since 2020, Power Cards have been able to be added to Google Pay and Apple Wallet through the DING DING DING app.

Events and sponsorships
Dave & Buster's is a corporate sponsor of the Ultimate Fighting Championship organization. There are screening rooms for every UFC pay-per-view and episode of The Ultimate Fighter. D&B also sponsors the charity Dave Bevans' Children in the fundraising event "D&B for DB's".

Prior sponsorships include a World Wrestling Entertainment match and a 2009 tour by the rock band Bowling for Soup. The WWE match took place on the July 20, 2009, edition of WWE Raw on the USA Network. It is believed to be the first match on any WWE program to have a specific sponsor associated with it.

Dave & Buster's also sponsors postgame reports of San Jose Sharks games.

Death of founders  

On January 2, 2023, co-founder James "Buster" Corley died of a self-inflicted gunshot wound sustained in his home near White Rock Lake. His daughter Kate Corley said that her father had not been the same after suffering a stroke four months ago that caused severe damage to the communication and personality part of his brain. He was the last surviving co-founder of the franchise as David "Dave" Corriveau had died in 2015.

References

External links

 

1982 establishments in Texas
Companies based in Dallas
Companies listed on the Nasdaq
Entertainment companies established in 1982
Entertainment companies of the United States
Regional restaurant chains in the United States
Restaurants established in 1982
Video arcades